Fontburn Halt was a weatherboard and corrugated-iron-built railway station in Northumberland, England, on the Rothbury Branch, built to serve the pre-existing Whitehouse lime works and later the Whitehouse Colliery, and quarries.

History

They were also permitted to build a short branch line to Cornhill. The North British Railway and the branch line became part of the London and North Eastern Railway in 1923. In September 1952 passenger services were withdrawn and the line closed in November 1963.

Constructed to serve Whitehouse lime works, the station later had a number of sidings serving various other local industries including the construction of the nearby Fontburn reservoir.

References

External links
Fontburn Halt on Northumbrian Railways
Fontburn Halt on Disused Stations
Fontburn Halt on a navigable 1956 OS map
The line on RailScot

Disused railway stations in Northumberland
Former North British Railway stations
Railway stations in Great Britain opened in 1904
Railway stations in Great Britain closed in 1956
1904 establishments in England